Whiteside County is a county located in the U.S. state of Illinois. According to the 2010 census, it had a population of 58,498. Its county seat is Morrison. The county is bounded on the west by the Mississippi River. Whiteside County comprises the Sterling, IL Micropolitan Statistical Area, which is also included in the Dixon-Sterling, IL Combined Statistical Area. U.S. President Ronald Reagan was born in 1911 in the Whiteside County community of Tampico.

History
This area was long occupied by varying cultures of Native Americans.

Whiteside County was organized by European Americans in 1836 from parts of Jo Daviess and Henry counties. It was named for General Samuel Whiteside, an Illinois officer in the War of 1812 and Black Hawk War.

Whiteside County's boundaries have remained unchanged since its creation in 1836.

Geography

Climate and weather

Major highways

  Interstate 88
  U.S. Highway 30
  Illinois Route 2
  Illinois Route 40
  Illinois Route 78
  Illinois Route 84
  Illinois Route 110
  Illinois Route 136
  Illinois Route 172

Adjacent counties
 Carroll County (north)
 Ogle County (northeast)
 Lee County (east)
 Bureau County (southeast)
 Henry County (south)
 Rock Island County (southwest)
 Clinton County, Iowa (west)

National protected area
 Upper Mississippi River National Wildlife and Fish Refuge (part)

Demographics

As of the 2010 United States Census, there were 58,498 people, 23,740 households, and 16,005 families residing in the county. The racial makeup of the county was 92.2% white, 1.3% black or African American, 0.5% Asian, 0.3% American Indian, 3.5% from other races, and 2.2% from two or more races. Those of Hispanic or Latino origin made up 11.0% of the population. In terms of ancestry, 32.5% were German, 15.5% were Irish, 8.7% were Dutch, 8.6% were English, and 6.0% were American.

Of the 23,740 households, 30.4% had children under the age of 18 living with them, 51.5% were married couples living together, 11.0% had a female householder with no husband present, 32.6% were non-families, and 27.7% of all households were made up of individuals. The average household size was 2.42 and the average family size was 2.92. The median age was 41.8 years.

The median income for a household in the county was $45,266 and the median income for a family was $54,242. Males had a median income of $41,862 versus $29,157 for females. The per capita income for the county was $23,405. About 8.2% of families and 11.2% of the population were below the poverty line, including 17.6% of those under age 18 and 5.8% of those age 65 or over.

Communities

Cities
 Fulton
 Morrison
 Prophetstown
 Rock Falls
 Sterling

Villages

 Albany
 Coleta
 Deer Grove
 Erie
 Lyndon
 Tampico

Unincorporated communities

 Agnew
 Fenton
 Galt
 Hahnaman
 Oliver
 Round Grove
 Union Grove
 Unionville
 Yeoward Addition

Census-designated place
 Como

Townships
Whiteside County is divided into these townships:

 Albany
 Clyde
 Coloma
 Erie
 Fenton
 Fulton
 Garden Plain
 Genesee
 Hahnaman
 Hopkins
 Hume
 Jordan
 Lyndon
 Montmorency
 Mount Pleasant
 Newton
 Portland
 Prophetstown
 Sterling
 Tampico
 Union Grove
 Ustick

Politics

Whiteside County has a political history typical of Northern Illinois. Between its first election in 1840, and 1852, it always favored the Whig Party, and although Whiteside was not as strong for the Free Soil Party as counties to the east like Boone and Lake, it gave substantial votes to that party in 1848 and 1852 and became powerfully Republican for the next century-and-a-quarter. Between 1856 and 1988 the only time Whiteside County did not vote for the Republican candidate was in 1912, when the GOP was mortally divided and Whiteside County voted for Progressive Party nominee and former President Theodore Roosevelt by a 2-to-1 margin over conservative incumbent William Howard Taft. Between at least 1880 and 1960, no Democratic presidential nominee ever won 40 percent of Whiteside County's vote, and even Alf Landon in 1936 carried the county by 22 percent when losing 46 of 48 states.

In 1964 the Republican Party nominated Barry Goldwater, whose hostility to the Yankee establishment and strongly conservative policies were sufficient to leave many traditional Republicans to stay home or even to vote for Lyndon Johnson. In this climate, Goldwater managed to keep the Republican Party's winning streak in Whiteside alive, but by just 1.6%, or 404 votes.

The county continued to vote comfortably more Republican than the nation for the next four elections. However, it began trending away from the GOP in 1984, as its most famous native, Ronald Reagan, successfully sought a second term. Even as Reagan increased his national margin by over 8%, his margin in Whiteside was more than halved, from a little over 40% in 1980 to 19.6% in 1984. The county was only marginally more Republican than the nation in 1984. The trend continued in 1988, as George H. W. Bush carried it by 6.8%, a somewhat smaller margin than he won the national popular vote by, making this election the first one in which Whiteside voted more Democratic than the nation in at least a century. In 1992, it gave Bill Clinton a plurality win, with a comfortable 8.0% margin over George H. W. Bush. In 1996, the county gave Bill Clinton an outright majority. The county went on to vote Democratic for the next four consecutive elections, giving Gore, Kerry, and Obama four straight majorities. 

However, in 2016, concerns over long-term economic decline saw much of the Rust Belt swing heavily towards Donald Trump, and Whiteside flipped from a 16.9% Obama win in 2012 to a Trump plurality in 2016. In 2020, Trump won a majority--the first for a Republican since 1988--and increased his margin from 6.2% to 8.3%.

See also
 List of counties in Illinois
 National Register of Historic Places listings in Whiteside County, Illinois

References

External links
 County History
 History of Whiteside
 County website

 
1836 establishments in Illinois
Illinois counties
Illinois counties on the Mississippi River
Populated places established in 1836